Oliver Parker (born 6 September 1960) is a British film director, screenwriter and former actor. He is known for writing and directing the film adaptations of Shakespeare's Othello (1995) and Wilde's The Importance of Being Earnest (2002), and for his role as Peloquin in the cult film Nightbreed (1990).

Biography
Parker was born in Plymouth, the second of three sons of Jillian, Lady Parker, a writer and GP (general practitioner), and Sir Peter Parker, formerly chairman of British Rail. 

His brothers include the public relations executive Sir Alan Parker (born 1956) and the actor Nathaniel Parker (born 1962). They also have a sister, Lucy.

Filmography

Films

Television
Matlock (1 episode, 1987) – Man at Butler's School
The Bill (1 episode, 1989) - Glen Phelps
Agatha Christie's Poirot (The Million Dollar Bond Robbery, 1991) - Philip Ridgeway
Casualty (18 episodes, 1993-94) - Mark Calder 
Lovejoy (Day of Reckoning, 1994) - Desmond Dexter

References

External links
 

1960 births
English film directors
English screenwriters
English male screenwriters
Living people
Writers from London
Writers from Plymouth, Devon